Easy Money Creek is a stream in Yukon–Koyukuk Census Area, Alaska, in the United States.

Prospectors likely coined the name Easy Money Creek which was recorded by the United States Geological Survey in 1912.

See also
List of rivers of Alaska

References

Rivers of Yukon–Koyukuk Census Area, Alaska
Rivers of Alaska
Rivers of Unorganized Borough, Alaska